Just enough operating system (JeOS, pronounced "juice" according to SUSE) is a paradigm for customizing operating systems to fit the needs of a particular application such as for a software appliance. The platform only includes the operating system components required to support a particular application and any other third-party components contained in the appliance (e.g., the kernel). This makes the appliance smaller, faster (to boot and to execute the particular application) and potentially more secure than an application running under a full general-purpose OS.

Common implementations 
Typically, a JeOS will consist of the following:
 JeOS media (OS core [kernel, virtual drives, login])
 OS minimum maintenance tools
 Minimum user space tools
 Packages repository (DVD or network based)

It is important to differentiate between true fully minimalized OS install profiles forced, for example, with security hardening tools or representing Recovery Console images and JeOS richer install profiles which are designed and built for wider audience usage, so VM/VA creators and their users can easily perform needed installation or configuration tasks.

See also 
 BareMetal
 Container Linux (discontinued)
 OpenELEC (JeOS software appliance with Kodi Media Center)
 LibreELEC (JeOS software appliance with Kodi Media Center)
 Ubuntu JeOS

References

External links 

 JeOS (Just Enough Operating System)
 SUSE Linux Enterprise Server 15 SP2 JeOS

 
Operating systems
Software appliances